The Kuiseb River is an ephemeral river in western-central Namibia. Its source is in the Khomas Highland west of Windhoek. From there it flows westwards through the Namib-Naukluft National Park and the Namib desert to Walvis Bay. Several settlements of the Topnaar people are on the banks of the lower Kuiseb, for instance Homeb, Sandfontein, Rooibank, and Utuseb. Inflows of the Kuiseb are Gomab, Ojab, Chausib, Gaub, Koam, Nausgomab and Goagos.

Friedenau Dam, built in 1972, is on the river. In January 2005, for the first time in years, the Kuiseb flowed to the ocean.

Between Naukluft and Namib the Kuiseb carved out a canyon in a barren and inaccessible area. During World War II the area around the Kuiseb Canyon served as a shelter for Henno Martin and Hermann Korn who moved there to wait the war out. Two books and a film were subsequently published about this 2-year stay; the ruins of their shelter can be visited. On its course through the Namib the Kuiseb is bordered on one side by some of the tallest sand dunes in the world, and on the other by barren rock. The red sand dunes south of the river reach heights over 150 meters. The prevailing winds blow the dunes northward, but their movement is blocked by the river. In the process, so much sand and silt is deposited in the Kuiseb that it only reaches the sea while it is in flood.

In 1907, the area between the Swakop River and the Kuiseb was designated by the German colonial administration as a game reserve. The area is currently part of the Namib-Naukluft National Park. The Desert Research Foundation of Namibia (DRFN) is located at Gobabeb on the banks of the river.

See also
 List of rivers of Namibia

References

Notes

Literature
 
 

The original entry was from the NASA Earth Observatory

External links

NASA Earth Explorer page
PhD Dissertation at the Helmholtz Centre for Environmental Research - UFZ

Rivers of Namibia
Geography of Khomas Region
Geography of Erongo Region
Namib-Naukluft National Park